The 2nd Theater Signal Brigade is a military communications brigade of the United States Army subordinate to the Army Network Enterprise Technology Command with headquarters at Lucius D. Clay Kaserne, Germany.

Composition
  2nd Theater Signal Brigade
 Headquarters and Headquarters Company (HHC), Lucius D. Clay Kaserne, Germany
  39th Strategic Signal Battalion (39th SSB), Chievres, Belgium
 44th Expeditionary Signal Battalion-Enhanced (44th ESB), Baumholder, Germany
  52nd Strategic Signal Battalion (52nd SSB), Stuttgart, Germany
  102nd Strategic Signal Battalion (102nd SSB), Wiesbaden, Germany
  509th Strategic Signal Battalion (509th SSB), Vicenza, Italy
 6981st Civilian Support Group (6981st CSG), Germersheim, Germany

Mission
The mission statement of the 2nd Theater Signal Brigade is "to deploy, install, operate, and maintain a tactical theater communications package worldwide while supporting joint and combined operations."

Lineage
Constituted 24 October 1944 in the Army of the United States as Headquarters and Headquarters Detachment, 3348th Signal Service Group, and activated in France

Inactivated 13 March 1946 in France

Activated 9 May 1946 at Fort Monmouth, New Jersey

Redesignated 14 March 1947 as Headquarters and Headquarters Detachment, 2d Signal Service Group

Allotted 1 March 1949 to the Regular Army

Reorganized and redesignated 16 December 1949 as Headquarters, 2d Signal Service Group

Reorganized and redesignated 25 March 1953 as Headquarters, 2d Signal Group

Inactivated 4 April 1955 at Camp Gordon, Georgia

Redesignated 27 April 1961 as Headquarters and Headquarters Detachment, 2d Signal Group

Activated 21 June 1961 at Fort Bragg, North Carolina

Inactivated 23 October 1971 at Fort Lewis, Washington

Activated 1 June 1974 in Germany

Redesignated 1 October 1979 as Headquarters and Headquarters Company, 2d Signal Brigade

Campaign participation credit

World War II: European-African-Middle Eastern Theater, Streamer without inscription

Vietnam: Defense: Counteroffensive; Counteroffensive, Phase II; Counteroffensive, Phase III; Tet Counteroffensive; Counteroffensive, Phase IV; Counteroffensive, Phase V; Counteroffensive, Phase VI; Tet 69/Counteroffensive; Summer-Fall 1969; Winter-Spring 1970; Sanctuary Counteroffensive; Counteroffensive, Phase VII; Consolidation I

Decorations
Meritorious Unit Commendation (Army) for VIETNAM 1965–1967
Meritorious Unit Commendation (Army) for VIETNAM 1967–1968
Army Superior Unit Award, Streamer embroidered 2004-2005
Army Superior Unit Award, Streamer embroidered 2009-2010

References

External links

 Official

 
 General information
 Lineage and Honors Information 

1944 establishments in France
1946 disestablishments in France
1946 establishments in New Jersey
1955 disestablishments in Georgia (U.S. state)
1961 establishments in North Carolina
1971 disestablishments in Washington (state)
1974 establishments in Germany
Military units and formations established in 1944
Military units and formations disestablished in 1946
Military units and formations established in 1946
Military units and formations disestablished in 1955
Military units and formations established in 1961
Military units and formations disestablished in 1971
Military units and formations established in 1974
002